The Sculptor may refer to:

 The Sculptor (film), an Australian film
 The Sculptor (comics), a 2015 graphic novel by Scott McCloud